In law, fraud is intentional deception to secure unfair or unlawful gain, or to deprive a victim of a legal right. Fraud can violate civil law (e.g., a fraud victim may sue the fraud perpetrator to avoid the fraud or recover monetary compensation) or criminal law (e.g., a fraud perpetrator may be prosecuted and imprisoned by governmental authorities), or it may cause no loss of money, property, or legal right but still be an element of another civil or criminal wrong. The purpose of fraud may be monetary gain or other benefits, for example by obtaining a passport, travel document, or driver's license, or mortgage fraud, where the perpetrator may attempt to qualify for a mortgage by way of false statements.

Internal fraud, also known as "insider fraud", is fraud committed or attempted by someone within an organisation such as an employee.

A hoax is a distinct concept that involves deliberate deception without the intention of gain or of materially damaging or depriving a victim.

As a civil wrong
In common law jurisdictions, as a civil wrong, fraud is a tort. While the precise definitions and requirements of proof vary among jurisdictions, the requisite elements of fraud as a tort generally are the intentional misrepresentation or concealment of an important fact upon which the victim is meant to rely, and in fact does rely, to the harm of the victim. Proving fraud in a court of law is often said to be difficult as the intention to defraud is the key element in question. As such, proving fraud comes with a "greater evidentiary burden than other civil claims". This difficulty is exacerbated by the fact that some jurisdictions require the victim to prove fraud by clear and convincing evidence.

The remedies for fraud may include rescission (i.e., reversal) of a fraudulently obtained agreement or transaction, the recovery of a monetary award to compensate for the harm caused, punitive damages to punish or deter the misconduct, and possibly others.

In cases of a fraudulently induced contract, fraud may serve as a defense in a civil action for breach of contract or specific performance of contract. Similarly, fraud may serve as a basis for a court to invoke its equitable jurisdiction.

As a criminal offense

In common law jurisdictions, as a criminal offense, fraud takes many different forms, some general (e.g., theft by false pretense) and some specific to particular categories of victims or misconduct (e.g., bank fraud, insurance fraud, forgery). The elements of fraud as a crime similarly vary. The requisite elements of perhaps the most general form of criminal fraud, theft by false pretense, are the intentional deception of a victim by false representation or pretense with the intent of persuading the victim to part with property and with the victim parting with property in reliance on the representation or pretense and with the perpetrator intending to keep the property from the victim.

By region

North America

Canada
Section 380(1) of the Criminal Code provides the general definition for fraud in Canada:

In addition to the penalties outlined above, the court can also issue a prohibition order under s. 380.2 (preventing a person from "seeking, obtaining or continuing any employment, or becoming or being a volunteer in any capacity, that involves having authority over the real property, money or valuable security of another person"). It can also make a restitution order under s. 380.3.

The Canadian courts have held that the offence consists of two distinct elements:

 A prohibited act of deceit, falsehood or other fraudulent means. In the absence of deceit or falsehood, the courts will look objectively for a "dishonest act"; and
 The deprivation must be caused by the prohibited act, and deprivation must relate to property, money, valuable security, or any service.

The Supreme Court of Canada has held that deprivation is satisfied on proof of detriment, prejudice or risk of prejudice; it is not essential that there be actual loss. Deprivation of confidential information, in the nature of a trade secret or copyrighted material that has commercial value, has also been held to fall within the scope of the offence.

United States

Criminal fraud
The proof requirements for criminal fraud charges in the United States are essentially the same as the requirements for other crimes: guilt must be proved beyond a reasonable doubt. Throughout the United States fraud charges can be misdemeanours or felonies depending on the amount of loss involved. High value fraud can also trigger additional penalties. For example, in California, losses of $500,000 or more will result in an extra two, three, or five years in prison in addition to the regular penalty for the fraud.

The U.S. government's 2006 fraud review concluded that fraud is a significantly under-reported crime, and while various agencies and organizations were attempting to tackle the issue, greater co-operation was needed to achieve a real impact in the public sector. The scale of the problem pointed to the need for a small but high-powered body to bring together the numerous counter-fraud initiatives that existed.

Civil fraud 

Although elements may vary by jurisdiction and the specific allegations made by a plaintiff who files a lawsuit that alleged fraud, typical elements of a fraud case in the United States are that:
Somebody misrepresents a material fact in order to obtain action or forbearance by another person;
The other person relies upon the misrepresentation; and
The other person suffers injury as a result of the act or forbearance taken in reliance upon the misrepresentation.

To establish a civil claim of fraud, most jurisdictions in the United States require that each element of a fraud claim be pleaded with particularity and be proved by a preponderance of the evidence, meaning that it is more likely than not that the fraud occurred. Some jurisdictions impose a higher evidentiary standard, such as Washington State's requirement that the elements of fraud be proved with clear, cogent, and convincing evidence (very probable evidence), or Pennsylvania's requirement that common law fraud be proved by clear and convincing evidence.

The measure of damages in fraud cases is normally computed using one of two rules:
The "benefit of bargain" rule, which allows for recovery of damages in the amount of the difference between the value of the property had it been as represented and its actual value;
Out-of-pocket loss, which allows for the recovery of damages in the amount of the difference between the value of what was given and the value of what was received.
Special damages may be allowed if shown to have been proximately caused by defendant's fraud and the damage amounts are proved with specificity.

Many jurisdictions permit a plaintiff in a fraud case to seek punitive or exemplary damages.

Asia

China
Zhang Yingyu's story collection The Book of Swindles (available here; ca. 1617) testifies to rampant commercial fraud, especially involving itinerant businessmen, in late Ming China. The Economist, CNN, and other media outlets regularly report on incidents of fraud or bad faith in Chinese business and trade practices. Forbes cites cybercrime as a persistent and growing threat to Chinese consumers.

India

In India the criminal laws are enshrined in the Indian Penal Code. It is supplemented by the Criminal Procedure Code and Indian Evidence Act.

Europe

United Kingdom
In 2016 the estimated value lost through fraud in the UK was £193 billion a year.

In January 2018 the Financial Times reported that the value of UK fraud hit a 15-year high of £2.11bn in 2017, according to a study. The article said that the accountancy firm BDO examined reported fraud cases worth more than £50,000 and found that the total number rose to 577 in 2017, compared with 212 in 2003. The study found that the average amount stolen in each incident rose to £3.66m, up from £1.5m in 2003.

As at November 2017, fraud is the most common criminal offence in the UK according to a study by Crowe Clark Whitehill, Experian and the Centre for Counter Fraud Studies. The study suggests the UK loses over £190 billion per year to fraud. £190 billion is more than 9% of the UK's projected GDP for 2017 ($2,496 (£2,080) billion according to Statistics Times.) The estimate for fraud in the UK figure is more than the entire GDP of countries such as Romania, Qatar and Hungary.

According to another review by the UK anti-fraud charity Fraud Advisory Panel (FAP), business fraud accounted for £144bn, while fraud against individuals was estimated at £9.7bn. The FAP has been particularly critical of the support available from the police to victims of fraud in the UK outside of London. Although victims of fraud are generally referred to the UK's national fraud and cyber crime reporting centre, Action Fraud, the FAP found that there was "little chance" that these crime reports would be followed up with any kind of substantive law enforcement action by UK authorities, according to the report.

In July 2016, it was reported that fraudulent activity levels in the UK increased in the 10 years leading up to 2016 from £52 billion to £193 bn. This figure would be a conservative estimate, since as the former commissioner of the City of London Police, Adrian Leppard, has said, only 1 in 12 such crimes are actually reported. Donald Toon, director of the NCA's economic crime command, stated in July 2016: "The annual losses to the UK from fraud are estimated to be more than £190bn". Figures released in October 2015 from the Crime Survey of England and Wales found that there had been 5.1 million incidents of fraud in England and Wales in the previous year, affecting an estimated one in 12 adults and making it the most common form of crime.

Also in July 2016, the Office for National Statistics (ONS) stated "Almost six million fraud and cyber crimes were committed last year in England and Wales and estimated there were two million computer misuse offences and 3.8 million fraud offences in the 12 months to the end of March 2016." Fraud affects one in ten people in the UK. According to the ONS, most fraud relates to bank account fraud. These figures are separate from the headline estimate that another 6.3 million crimes (distinct from fraud) were perpetrated in the UK against adults in the year to March 2016.

Fraud was not included in a "Crime Harm Index" published by the Office for National Statistics in 2016. Michael Levi, professor of criminology at Cardiff University, remarked in August 2016 that it was "deeply regrettable" that fraud was being left out of the first index despite being the most common crime reported to police in the UK. Levi said "If you've got some categories that are excluded, they are automatically left out of the police's priorities." The Chief of the National Audit Office (NAO), Sir Anyas Morse has also said "For too long, as a low-value but high-volume crime, online fraud has been overlooked by government, law enforcement and industry. It is now the most commonly experienced crime in England and Wales and demands an urgent response."

HM Treasury issued guidance to central government departments in January 2011 concerned with "Tackling Internal Fraud", concerned that economic pressures and potential staff redundancies at the time might lead those staff who "might be tempted" to commit fraud to make more of any opportunity which might arise, noting a possible shift in the balance between "the reward from fraud" and the risk of detection. An aspect of the guidance was to equip staff to look out for "fraud indicators": clues or hints that an individual member of staff, team or area of activity might need "a closer look".

England, Wales, and Northern Ireland
Since 2007, fraud in England and Wales and Northern Ireland has been covered by the Fraud Act 2006. The Act was given Royal Assent on 8 November 2006, and came into effect on 15 January 2007.

The Act gives a statutory definition of the criminal offence of fraud, defining it in three classes—fraud by false representation, fraud by failing to disclose information, and fraud by abuse of position. It provides that a person found guilty of fraud is liable to a fine or imprisonment for up to twelve months on summary conviction (six months in Northern Ireland), or a fine or imprisonment for up to ten years on conviction on indictment. This Act largely replaces the laws relating to obtaining property by deception, obtaining a pecuniary advantage and other offences that were created under the Theft Act 1978.

Scotland
In Scots law, fraud is covered under the common law and a number of statutory offences. The main fraud offences are common law fraud, uttering, embezzlement, and statutory fraud. The Fraud Act 2006 does not apply in Scotland.

Governmental Organizations

The Serious Fraud Office is an arm of the Government of the United Kingdom, accountable to the Attorney-General.

The National Fraud Authority (NFA) was, until 2014, a government agency coordinating the counter-fraud response in the UK.

Cifas is a British fraud prevention service, a not-for-profit membership organization for all sectors that enables organizations to share and access fraud data using their databases. Cifas is dedicated to the prevention of fraud, including internal fraud by staff, and the identification of financial and related crime.

Cost
Participants of a 2010 survey by the Association of Certified Fraud Examiners estimated that the typical organization loses five percent of its annual revenue to fraud, with a median loss of $160,000. Fraud committed by owners and executives were more than nine times as costly as employee fraud. The industries most commonly affected are banking, manufacturing, and government.

Types of fraudulent acts

The falsification of documents, known as forgery, and counterfeiting are types of fraud involved in physical duplication or fabrication. The "theft" of one's personal information or identity, like one finding out another's social security number and then using it as identification, is a type of fraud. Fraud can be committed through and across many media including mail, wire, phone, and the Internet (computer crime and Internet fraud).

Given the international nature of the web and ease with which users can hide their location, obstacles to checking identity and legitimacy online, and the variety of hacker techniques available to gain access to PII have all contributed to the very rapid growth of Internet fraud.  In some countries, tax fraud is also prosecuted under false billing or tax forgery. There have also been fraudulent "discoveries", e.g., science, where the appetite is for prestige rather than immediate monetary gain.

Commodities fraud 
The illegal act of obtaining (or the attempt of obtaining) a certain amount of currency in accordance with a contract that promises the later exchange of equated assets, which ultimately never arrive, is a type of fraud, known as commodities fraud. Alternatively, the term can relate to: the failure of registering in an exchange; the act of deliberately providing falsified information to clients; the action of executing transactions with the sole purpose of making a profit for the payee; the theft of client funds.

Detection

The detection of fraudulent activities on a large scale is possible with the harvesting of massive amounts of financial data paired with predictive analytics or forensic analytics, the use of electronic data to reconstruct or detect financial fraud.

Using computer-based analytic methods in particular allows for surfacing of errors, anomalies, inefficiencies, irregularities, and biases which often refer to fraudsters gravitating to certain dollar amounts to get past internal control thresholds. These high-level tests include tests related to Benford's Law and possibly also those statistics known as descriptive statistics. High-level tests are always followed by more focused tests to look for small samples of highly irregular transactions. The familiar methods of correlation and time-series analysis can also be used to detect fraud and other irregularities.

Anti-fraud provisioning

Beyond laws that aim at prevention of fraud, there are also governmental and non-governmental organizations that aim to fight fraud. Between 1911 and 1933, 47 states adopted the so-called Blue Sky Laws status.
These laws were enacted and enforced at the state level and regulated the offering and sale of securities to protect the public from fraud. Though the specific provisions of these laws varied among states, they all required the registration of all securities offerings and sales, as well as of every U.S. stockbroker and brokerage firm. However, these Blue Sky laws were generally found to be ineffective. To increase public trust in the capital markets the President of the United States, Franklin D. Roosevelt, established the U.S. Securities and Exchange Commission (SEC). The main reason for the creation of the SEC was to regulate the stock market and prevent corporate abuses relating to the offering and sale of securities and corporate reporting. The SEC was given the power to license and regulate stock exchanges, the companies whose securities traded on them, and the brokers and dealers who conducted the trading.

Further reading

Apart from fraud, there are several related categories of intentional deceptions that may or may not include the elements of personal gain or damage to another individual:
 Obstruction of justice
  which criminalizes false representation of having been awarded any decoration or medal authorized by Congress for the Armed Forces of the United States

See also

 Bait-and-switch
 Caper stories (such as The Sting)
 Contract fraud
 Corruption
 Cramming (fraud)
 Creative accounting
 Crimestoppers
 Deception
 Electoral fraud
 Embezzlement
 False Claims Act
 Federal Bureau of Investigation (FBI)
 Financial crimes
 Forgery
 Fortune telling fraud
 Fraud deterrence
 Fraud in the factum
 Fraud in parapsychology
 Fraud Squad (UK)
 Friendly fraud
 Front running
 Geneivat da'at
 Great Stock Exchange Fraud of 1814
 Guinness share-trading fraud, famous British business scandal of the 1980s
 Hoax
 Identity management
 Impersonator
 Internal Revenue Service (IRS)
 Internet fraud
 Interpol
 Journalism fraud
 Mail and wire fraud
 Money laundering
 Misappropriation
 The National Council Against Health Fraud
 Organized crime
 Phishing, attempt to fraudulently acquire sensitive information
 Placebo
 Police impersonation
 Political corruption
 Push payment fraud
 Quackery
 Quatloos.com
 Racketeer Influenced and Corrupt Organizations Act (RICO)
 SAS 99
 Scam
 Scientific misconduct
 Secret profits
 Shell company
 Swampland in Florida
 Tobashi scheme, concealing financial losses
 U.S. Securities and Exchange Commission (SEC)
 United States Postal Inspection Service
 United States Secret Service
 White-collar crime
 Wood laundering

References

Further reading
 Edward J. Balleisen Fraud: An American History from Barnum to Madoff.  (2017). Princeton University Press.
 Fred Cohen Frauds, Spies, and Lies – and How to Defeat Them.  (2006). ASP Press.
 Green, Stuart P. Lying, Cheating, and Stealing: A Moral Theory of White Collar Crime. Oxford University Press, 2006. 
 Review Fraud – Alex Copola Podgor, Ellen S. Criminal Fraud, (1999) Vol, 48, No. 4 American Law Review 1.
 The Nature, Extent and Economic Impact of Fraud in the UK. February, 2007.
 The Fraudsters – How Con Artists Steal Your Money.  by Eamon Dillon, published September 2008 by Merlin Publishing
 Zhang, Yingyu. The Book of Swindles: Selections from a Late Ming Collection. Columbia University Press, 2017.

External links

 
 Association of Certified Fraud Examiners
 Immigration Marriage Fraud Amendments of 1986
 FBI Home page for fraud
 U.S. Department of Justice Fraud Section

 
Crimes
Deception
Tort law
Property crimes
Financial crimes